"Invincible" is the debut single from Adelitas Way's debut album, Adelitas Way, it was used as the theme song for WWE Superstars. On April 17, 2009, the song became available to iTunes. "Invincible" was also featured on the CSI: Miami season finale commercials which aired on CBS from May 11–18, 2009 and on an episode of the MTV show Bully Beatdown as the entrance theme for the bully. The song reached number 25 on the Billboard Rock Songs chart and number six on the Hot Mainstream Rock Tracks chart.

Song meaning
According to Rick Dejesus, the song is about overcoming challenges: "When we wrote it, it was more for the state that everyone was in, everything, the country. People were saying that we were in a recession and I had the feeling like, man, you know what, we're the United States, man, you know. We've always been the strongest, we've always been the most powerful, we've always been the smartest and, you know, "Invincible" is a song that I wanted everyone to break through the wall and break through the barrier."

Music video
The music video for "Invincible" was directed by Dale Restighini. Two versions of the video were released; one depicts only the band members performing the song while the other includes actors portraying troubled people inspired by the music and a large light structure behind the band which Restighini calls "The Beacon of Hope". Virgin Records also released a "making of" video. As of February 2010, the video has been in the Fuse TV Rock No. 1 Countdown for four months, and was a high as number five.

Track listing

References

2009 songs
Sports television theme songs
Adelitas Way songs
Songs written by Dave Bassett (songwriter)
Songs written by Rick DeJesus
Song recordings produced by Johnny K
Alternative metal songs